Aghbolagh-e Hamadani (also Romanized as Āghbolāgh-e Hamadānī; also known as Āqbolāgh-e Hamadān and Āqbolāgh-e Hamedānī) is a village in Chaman Rural District, Takht-e Soleyman District, Takab County, West Azerbaijan Province, Iran. At the 2006 census, its population was 119, in 24 families.

References 

Populated places in Takab County